ECD may refer to:

 Early childhood development
 Eastern Caribbean dollar
 Eastern Continental Divide in North America
 ECD (gene)
 E. C. Drury School for the Deaf, in Milton, Ontario, Canada
 Electronic Commerce Directive 2000
 Electronic Control Device, a TASER or stun gun
 Economic Crime Department of the City of London Police
 Electron capture detector
 Electron-capture dissociation
 Electronic civil disobedience
 Energy Citations Database, maintained by the United States Department of Energy
 Energy Conversion Devices, an American photovoltaics manufacturer
 English country dance, a type of social dance
 Equine Cushing's disease
 Erdheim–Chester disease
 Expanded criteria donor, a class of organ donors
 Explanatory combinatorial dictionary